Carl Douglas McCoy (born 15 January 1963) is a British singer who is the frontman for the gothic rock band Fields of the Nephilim.

Biography 
McCoy frequently uses mystical and occult references in his lyrics. Samples of Aleister Crowley's voice were featured on Elizium.

McCoy owns a graphics company, Sheerfaith, which has supplied art and design for all of his musical projects. Sheerfaith has also produced artwork for other projects, such as for the Storm Constantine book Hermetech and Andrew Collins' 21st Century Grail. He is a 3D artist, a longtime user of LightWave 3D.

McCoy appeared as the nomad in the film Hardware (1990), directed by Richard Stanley, who had previously directed a number of videos for Fields of the Nephilim.

Personal life 
McCoy comes from a religious background; he grew up in England with his mother, who was deeply religious, a Jehovah's Witness. McCoy later dealt with his relation to Christianity critically in some of his songs such as "Chord of Souls". He has talked in interviews about his belief in paganism. He is married to Lynne (nee Stappard) and has two daughters.

Vocal style 
McCoy's vocal style has been described as sounding like he 'gargles with gravel.' He attributes this to a childhood laryngeal burn: "I only sang the way I sang because I burnt my throat when I was a kid. I got hot food stuck down there and my throat got singed. I couldn’t talk for four weeks, but the effects lasted forever!"

Discography 

 Watain – Lawless Darkness (2010, guest vocals)

References

Further reading 
Baddeley, Gavin: Goth Chic: A Connoisseur's Guide to Dark Culture (Plexus, 2002), 

Gothic rock musicians
1963 births
Living people
English male singers
English occultists
People from Lambeth
British modern pagans
English people of Scottish descent
Performers of modern pagan music